Boldaji (also Romanized as Boldājī; also known as Būldāji) is a city in Boldaji District of Borujen County, Chaharmahal and Bakhtiari province, Iran. At the 2006 census, its population was 10,905 in 2,598 households. The following census in 2011 counted 11,728 people in 3,267 households. The latest census in 2016 showed a population of 11,980 people in 3,546 households. The village is populated by Turkic people with a small minority of Lurs and Persians.

References 

Borujen County

Cities in Chaharmahal and Bakhtiari Province

Populated places in Chaharmahal and Bakhtiari Province

Populated places in Borujen County